Hicham Zerouali (born 17 January 1977 – 5 December 2004), nicknamed 'Zero' or the 'Moroccan Magician', was a Moroccan footballer. He played as a forward for clubs in Morocco, Scotland and the United Arab Emirates. He played internationally for Morocco with 7 caps.

Club career

Aberdeen
After playing in his native Morocco for Yaakoub El Mansouria and USP Police, Zerouali was signed by Aberdeen manager Ebbe Skovdahl from FUS de Rabat in November 1999 for a fee of £450,000, on the recommendation of the club's director of football, Keith Burkinshaw. He became the first player in Scotland to wear the shirt number '0' in 2000, which was outlawed the following season by the Scottish Premier League and the Premier League in England.

In January 2000, Zerouali scored a thirty-yard free kick in a fourth round Scottish Cup tie away to St Mirren to take the tie to a replay. Zerouali then scored in the 2–0 replay win at Pittodrie to help the club into the next round of the competition. Aberdeen reached both the 2000 Scottish League Cup Final and the 2000 Scottish Cup Final with Zerouali playing in both matches, although they ended in defeat to Celtic and Rangers respectively.

In August 2000, Zerouali was injured with a broken ankle during a match against Motherwell, and subsequently missed out on a place at the Sydney Olympic Games, and was eventually out of action for a full year. In one of his more memorable outings after his return, he scored a hat-trick against Dundee.

Al-Nassr and FAR Rabat

After his contract at Aberdeen expired, he then moved to play his football in the United Arab Emirates with the team Al-Nassr for a year, before returning to live in his home country of Morocco in 2003, signing for FAR Rabat, where he won the Coupe du Trône that year.

International career

Zerouali won 7 caps for the Morocco national football team and scored three goals. He featured for Morocco in the 2002 Africa Cup of Nations in Mali, and scored two goals in a 2–1 win over Burkina Faso. He also played in the 1997 FIFA World Youth Championship. He was in the international squad a month before his death.

Death

Zerouali was killed in a car accident in Rabat in December 2004 aged 27. Only the previous Saturday, he had scored two goals in a league game for his club. He left a daughter with his girlfriend in Aberdeen.

A firm fans' favourite at Aberdeen, he was affectionately known as 'Zero' to the supporters. A memorial and tribute was held at Pittodrie Stadium after he died, which was attended by thousands of fans, despite him not playing for the club at the time and only having spent a short period there.

References

External links

https://www.worldfootball.net/player_summary/hicham-zerouali/

1977 births
2004 deaths
Moroccan footballers
Footballers from Rabat
Morocco under-20 international footballers
Morocco international footballers
Association football forwards
Fath Union Sport players
Aberdeen F.C. players
Al Nassr FC players
AS FAR (football) players
Road incident deaths in Morocco
Moroccan expatriate footballers
Scottish Premier League players
Expatriate footballers in Scotland
Expatriate footballers in the United Arab Emirates
2002 African Cup of Nations players
Moroccan expatriate sportspeople in Scotland
Moroccan expatriate sportspeople in the United Arab Emirates
Saudi Professional League players